Julia Glass (born March 23, 1956) is an American novelist. Her debut novel, Three Junes, won the National Book Award for Fiction in 2002.

Glass followed Three Junes with a second novel, The Whole World Over, in 2006,  set in the same Bank Street–Greenwich Village universe, with three interwoven stories featuring several characters from Three Junes. Her third novel, I See You Everywhere, was published in 2008; her fourth, The Widower's Tale, in 2010; her fifth, And the Dark Sacred Night, in 2014; her sixth, The House Among the Trees, in 2017; her seventh, Vigil Harbor, in 2022.

Glass was born in Boston, grew up in Belmont, Massachusetts and Lincoln, Massachusetts, and attended Concord Academy. She graduated from Yale in 1978. Intending to become a painter, she moved to New York City, where she lived for many years, painting in a small studio in Brooklyn and supporting herself as a freelance editor and copy editor, including several years in the copy department of Cosmopolitan magazine.  She lives in Marblehead, Massachusetts, with her partner, the photographer Dennis Cowley, and their two children, and works as a freelance journalist and editor, while teaching fiction writing at Emerson College. She is a previous winner of the William Faulkner - William Wisdom Creative Writing Competition.

References

External links
National Book Award acceptance speech by Glass
Author's Random House page
Interview with Julia Glass on The Writing Life
Interview with Julia Glass on The Widower's Tale

1956 births
Living people
21st-century American novelists
American women novelists
People from Marblehead, Massachusetts
People from Lincoln, Massachusetts
Yale University alumni
National Book Award winners
Writers from Boston
21st-century American women writers
20th-century American novelists
20th-century American women writers
Concord Academy alumni
Novelists from Massachusetts